Randi Nilsine Bakke (married name: Gjertsen; 29 October 1904, in Oslo – 21 May 1984, in Nesodden) was a Norwegian pair skater. She represented Oslo Skøiteklub.

Her pairs partner was Christen Christensen. They are the 1933 World bronze medalists. They finished fifth at the 1923 World Figure Skating Championships and the 1934 World Figure Skating Championships. They represented Norway at the 1936 Winter Olympics, where they placed 15th.

Results
with Christen Christensen

References

External links

1904 births
1984 deaths
Norwegian female pair skaters
Olympic figure skaters of Norway
Figure skaters at the 1936 Winter Olympics
Sportspeople from Oslo
World Figure Skating Championships medalists
20th-century Norwegian women